In enzymology, a polyvinyl-alcohol oxidase is an enzyme that catalyzes the chemical reaction

polyvinyl alcohol + O2  oxidized polyvinyl alcohol + H2O2

Thus, the two substrates of this enzyme are polyvinyl alcohol and O2, whereas its two products are oxidized polyvinyl alcohol and H2O2.

This enzyme belongs to the family of oxidoreductases, specifically those acting on the CH-OH group of donor with oxygen as acceptor.  The systematic name of this enzyme class is polyvinyl-alcohol:oxygen oxidoreductase. Other names in common use include dehydrogenase, polyvinyl alcohol, and PVA oxidase.

References

 
 

EC 1.1.3
Enzymes of unknown structure